Roko is a title of chiefly rank, specifically from the Lau Islands of Fiji . Its equivalent from the Kubuna Confederacy is the Bauan form of Ratu and Ro from parts of the Burebasaga Confederacy. This title was widely used among members of the chiefly Vuanirewa clan up to the mid 19th century. Increasing inte marriage  among the chiefly households of Lakeba and Bau, thereafter, saw the increasing use of Ratu and Adi by members of the Vuanirewa dynasty. The current heir to the Tui Nayau title, Finau Mara, uses the Baun title Ratu instead of Roko. This is true for all of his siblings apart from his younger brother Tevita Uluilakeba Mara, who is generally known as Roko Ului.

References

 Lau Islands, Fiji, By Arthur Maurice Hocart, Published 1929, Bernice P. Bishop Museum, Ethnology, 241 pages, Original from the University of Michigan, no.62 1929, Digitized Feb 23, 2007. Page 150 has details on titles like Ratu and Roko and their use

.
.
Noble titles
Titles of national or ethnic leadership
Vuanirewa
Lau Islands